Alan Chadwick (July 27, 1909 – May 25, 1980) an English master gardener, was a leading innovator of organic farming techniques and influential educator in the field of biodynamic/French intensive gardening. He was a student of Rudolf Steiner and is often cited as inspirational to the development of the "California cuisine" movement. The Chadwick restaurant in Beverly Hills was named after him. His grave is marked by a stupa at the Green Gulch Farm Zen Center in California. Chadwick is the subject of a 2013 retrospective by a former University of California, Santa Cruz, professor, Paul Lee, called There Is a Garden in the Mind: A Memoir of Alan Chadwick and the Organic Movement in California.

See also
Biointensive
Biodynamic agriculture
French intensive gardening
Green Gulch Farm Zen Center
Organic farming

Notes

External links 
Alan Chadwick -- A Brief Biography
Chadwick, Alan 
Alan Chadwick -- Cutting Edge Groundbreakers 
 Alan Chadwick is Gone

Alan Chadwick's lecture on anemone cultivation
A Tribute to Alan Chadwick, Master Gardener
Fire in the Garden
French Intensive Gardening: A Retrospective, News & Notes of the UC Santa Cruz Farm & Garden, Issue 112, Winter 2007
Alan Chadwick, Center on Philanthropy at Indiana University, Chadwick, Alan
Guide to the Alan Chadwick Papers, UC Santa Cruz Special Collections and Archives
Alan Chadwick, a Gardener of Souls A Resource Center about Alan Chadwick, his Gardens, and his Mission
Photographs from the Alan Chadwick Garden series, UC Santa Cruz Library's Digital Collections
 http://chadwickarchive.org

English ecologists
English horticulturists
English garden writers
English gardeners
1909 births
1980 deaths
Anthroposophists
20th-century British botanists
20th-century British writers
Organic farmers
University of California, Santa Cruz people